Warren Keith Lieberstein (born September 20, 1968) is an American writer and producer. He has worked on shows such as Carpoolers and The Office, to which he has extensive ties. He is the younger brother of Paul Lieberstein, the show's former showrunner/actor and the brother-in-law of Greg Daniels, its developer and original producer.

He often works with his writing partner Halsted Sullivan.

Career 
Lieberstein worked on the short-lived sketch comedy series Hype in 2000 and on ABC's 2003 series All of Us. He has also written for Second Time Around, Modern Men and Carpoolers. He joined his brother on the writing staff of The Office at the end of its fifth season and became a producer at the beginning of the sixth season. He was nominated for a Writers Guild of America award for writing on The Office.

Episodes of The Office 
Episodes are all co-written with Halsted Sullivan.
 "Cafe Disco" (5.27)
 "Koi Pond" (6.08)
 "Whistleblower" (6.26)
 "China" (7.10)
 "After Hours" (8.16)
 "Turf War" (8.23)
 "Paper Airplane" (9.20)

Personal life 

Lieberstein and Angela Kinsey (who plays Angela Martin on The Office) were married for ten years and have a daughter who was born in 2008. The pair have remained on good terms since their divorce. Lieberstein married fellow television writer Audrey Wauchope in 2016 and they have two daughters together, born in 2014  and 2017. His family is Jewish.

References

External links 

American television writers
American male television writers
American television producers
Jewish American writers
Living people
1968 births
21st-century American Jews
Writers from Connecticut
People from Westport, Connecticut